Statistics of the Turkish First Football League in season 1989/1990.

Overview
It was contested by 18 teams, and Beşiktaş J.K. won the championship.

League table

Results

References
Turkey - List of final tables (RSSSF)

Süper Lig seasons
1989–90 in Turkish football
Turkey